

The Venga TG-10 Brushfire was a military trainer aircraft developed in Canada in the late 1980s. The sole prototype was destroyed in a fire without having flown. The TG-10 was a low-wing, single-engine jet with seating in tandem for the pilot and instructor. In general layout, it resembled the Northrop F-5 but had twin, outwardly-canted tail fins. Construction was of composite materials throughout. Announced to the public at the 1987 Paris Air Show, the key selling point of the design was its low cost, offering the performance of competing jet trainers at the cost of a turboprop trainer. Venga Aerospace claimed letters of interest from five countries, involving up to 160 aircraft. A single-seat ground-attack version and a UAV version were also considered.

Venga hoped to be able to enter the design in the USAF's JPATS competition, but this did not transpire. Finance proved an ongoing problem for the project, despite a partnership with Chinese firm Baosteel announced in 1994, as the first prototype was nearing completion. At the time, Venga still claimed "soft orders" for 86 aircraft from five customers.  The aircraft was destroyed in a fire in May 1998, and no further work was undertaken. However, as recently as 2004, Venga hoped to relaunch the project.

Specifications (prototype, as designed)

Notes

References
 
 
 
 
 
 
 
 
 
 

Abandoned military aircraft projects of Canada
1990s Canadian military trainer aircraft
1990s Canadian attack aircraft